Stigmella birgittae is a moth of the family Nepticulidae. It was described by Gustafsson in 1985. It is present in Gambia, Oman and Saudi Arabia.

Small Description 

The larvae feed on Ziziphus mauritiana and Ziziphus spina-christi. They mine the leaves of their host plant. The mine has the form of a gallery, and frequently also forms a small blotch through coalescence of the windings. The frass is deposited in a narrow central line. The larvae are yellowish green. When they leave the mine, they make a slit in the upper surface.

References 

Nepticulidae
Fauna of the Gambia
Insects of the Arabian Peninsula
Moths of Africa
Moths of Asia
Moths described in 1985